In sport, the Third Division, also called Division 3, Division Three, or Division III, is often the third-highest division of a league, and will often have promotion and relegation with divisions above and below.

Association football
Belgian Third Division, third-highest level in Belgian football
Cypriot Third Division, third major league of Cyprus
Egyptian Third Division, third level of the Egyptian football league system
Football League Third Division, third tier of English football from 1920 until 1992
French Division 3 (disambiguation)
Galway & District League Third Division, fourth tier of the Galway & District League football 
Hong Kong Third Division League, third level of football of the Hong Kong Football Association
Liga Indonesia Third Division, lowest level of nationwide football competition in Indonesia
Interdistrict Division Three, fifth tier of football in the Northern New South Wales Australia
Iran Football's 3rd Division, fourth-highest division in the Iranian football system
Kildare Senior Football League Division 3, Kildare Gaelic Athletic Association 
Kolmonen – Finnish League Division 3, fifth level in the league system of Finnish football 
Lebanese Third Division, third division of Lebanese football
Leinster League Division Three, third division of the Leinster League 
Libyan Third Division, third tier of Libyan football
Maltese Third Division, lowest league level in Maltese football
Norwegian Third Division, fourth-highest division of football in Norway
Terceira Divisão, fourth level of the Portuguese football league system
Russian Amateur Football League or III Division, fourth tier of the Russian football league system
Scottish Football League Third Division, fourth-highest division in the Scottish football system
Sligo Intermediate Football League Division 3 (ex Div. 2), Sligo Gaelic Athletic Association 
Swedish Football Division 3, fifth level in the league system of Swedish football 
Swedish Women's Football Division 3, fourth level in the league system of Swedish women's football 
Victorian State League Division 3, fourth tier football competition in Victoria, Australia
Welsh Football League Division Three, fourth level of the football league system in south Wales
York Football League Division Three, fourth level in the York Football League system

Other sports
AIB Division Three, rugby union league in Ireland
NCAA Division III, the third tier of intercollegiate sports in the United States
FFHG Division 3, ice hockey, France
IIHF World Championship Division III, lowest level of the International Ice Hockey Federation
National Conference League Division 3, fourth division in the British Amateur Rugby League 
North Division Three (shinty), fourth tier of the Shinty league system in Scotland
Portuguese Handball Third Division, fourth handball league in Portugal
Rugby Football League Championship Third Division, third level of Britain's Rugby Football League
Scottish National League Division Three, one of Scotland's national rugby union league divisions
Speedway National League Division Three, third division of motorcycle speedway in the United Kingdom
WRU Division Three East, a rugby union league in Wales
WRU Division Three North, a rugby union league in Wales
WRU Division Three South East, a rugby union league in Wales
WRU Division Three South West, a rugby union league in Wales
WRU Division Three West, a rugby union league in Wales

See also
 3rd Division (disambiguation), for usage of the term in the military